M84 or M-84 may refer to:

 Messier 84, a galaxy in the Virgo Cluster
 M-84, a Yugoslav main battle tank
 M84 machine gun, Yugoslavia
 M84 camouflage pattern, used by the Danish Army
 M84 stun grenade, a non-lethal grenade
 152 mm field gun-howitzer M84 NORA-A, Yugoslavia
 M-84 (Michigan highway), a US state highway
 M84 Mortar Carrier

nl:M84